Anton Sergeyevich Kushnir (born 13 October 1984 in Chervonoarmiysk, now Radyvyliv, Rivne oblast, Ukraine) is a Belarusian aerial skier who competed in the 2006, 2010 and the 2014 Winter Olympics. He has five World Cup victories. Kushnir won a bronze medal at the 2011 FIS Freestyle World Ski Championships. He won a gold medal at the 2014 Winter Olympics in Sochi, Russia, with the highest score in Olympics history.

He is of Ukrainian origin.

References

Freestyle skiers at the 2006 Winter Olympics
Freestyle skiers at the 2010 Winter Olympics
Freestyle skiers at the 2014 Winter Olympics
Freestyle skiers at the 2018 Winter Olympics
Olympic freestyle skiers of Belarus
Ukrainian male freestyle skiers 
Belarusian male freestyle skiers
1984 births
Living people
Olympic medalists in freestyle skiing
Medalists at the 2014 Winter Olympics
Olympic gold medalists for Belarus
Ukrainian emigrants to Belarus
Naturalized citizens of Belarus